4-Bromomethcathinone (4-BMC, Brephedrone) is a psychoactive drug and research chemical of the phenethylamine, amphetamine, and cathinone chemical classes. It acts as a serotonin and norepinephrine reuptake inhibitor, but acts more like an antidepressant than a stimulant. It is currently unclear whether the 4-halogenated cathinones share the selective serotonergic neurotoxicity of their corresponding amphetamines.

Legal status
As of October 2015, 4-BMC is a controlled substance in China.
4-Bromomethcathinone is considered a Schedule 1 substance in Virginia.

See also 
 4-Chloromethcathinone
 4-Ethylmethcathinone

References 

Cathinones
Designer drugs
Bromoarenes
Serotonin–norepinephrine reuptake inhibitors
Entactogens and empathogens